Binta International Schools is a group of schools founded by Wale Adenuga and located in Lagos State. It operates a creche, nursery, basic and high schools. The school was established in Ejigbo in 1994, but later opened in Ajao Estate, Isolo. The slogan of the school is "the school for the child you love", while the motto is "excellence and discipline". The name "BINTA" is an acronym for "Best In Nurturing Talents and Academics". They offer scholarships to deserving students yearly. Binta International School was the secondary school of "Binta" in the national television series Binta and Friends.

Awards 
 first position in Africa Independent Television Whizkid competition (November 1995)
 first prize in 12th Unilever essay competition (year 2000)
 first position in Africa Independent Television debate competition (July 2000)
 second prize in  Cowbell annual Lagos all Secondary School Mathematics competition
 letter of recommendation from National Mathematics Center, Abuja in June 2001

References

External links
 
 Binta International School at Lagos State education database. 

1994 establishments in Nigeria
Educational institutions established in 1994
Secondary schools in Lagos State